Archips purpuranus, the omnivorous leafroller moth, is a species of moth of the family Tortricidae. It is found in most of eastern North America.

The length of the forewings is 8.5–11 mm for males and 10.5–12.5 mm for females. The color of the forewings varies from brown to dark purplish brown, with brown to dark brown markings and reticulations. Adults are on wing from June to July in one generation per year in most of the range.

The larvae are polyphagous and have been recorded feeding on the foliage of a large range of plants, including Rhus, Erigeron annuus, Solidago, Betula (including Betula papyrifera and Betula populifolia), Viburnum, Cornus canadensis, Sedum, Sempervivum, Vaccinium, Lupinus, Quercus macrocarpa, Geranium, Ribes, Sassafras, Maianthemum racemosum, Fraxinus, Fragaria, Malus, Prunus (including Prunus pensylvanica and Prunus virginiana), Rubus (including Rubus plicatus), Spiraea, Populus tremuloides, Salix, Mandragora, Tilia americana and Viola species. The larvae have a pale bluish green body and a yellowish brown head. They reach a length of 20–30 mm when full grown. The species overwinters as a third instar larva.

References

Moths described in 1865
Archips
Moths of North America